Dehnow (also known as Dehnow Sarvestan) is a village in Shurjeh Rural District, in the Central District of Sarvestan County, Fars Province, Iran. At the 2006 census, its population was 751, in 166 families.

References 

Populated places in Sarvestan County